The Philippine House Committee on Good Government and Public Accountability, or House Good Government and Public Accountability Committee is a standing committee of the Philippine House of Representatives.

Jurisdiction 
As prescribed by House Rules, the committee's jurisdiction is on the malfeasance, misfeasance and nonfeasance in office committed by government employees and officials which covers its political subdivisions and instrumentalities. It also includes investigations of any matter of public interest on its own initiative or upon order of the House.

Members, 18th Congress

Historical members

18th Congress

Chairperson 
 Jose Antonio Sy-Alvarado (Bulacan–1st, NUP) July 22, 2019 – November 25, 2020

See also
 House of Representatives of the Philippines
 List of Philippine House of Representatives committees

References

External links 
House of Representatives of the Philippines

Good Government and Public Accountability